Bar-Lev is a Hebrew surname which means "son (of) heart" and "pure heart" (Psalm 24:4), and may refer to:

 Amir Bar-Lev (born 1974), American film director
 Haim Bar-Lev (1924-1994), Israeli politician- born Haim Brotzlewsky
 Omer Bar-Lev (born 1953), Israeli politician, son of Haim
 Bar Lev Line
 Bar-Lev (game), a board wargame published in 1974 by Conflict Games

Hebrew-language surnames
Jewish surnames